Dávid Szintai (born 9 June 1997) is a Hungarian tennis player.

Szintai has a career high ATP singles ranking of 1052 achieved on 2 July 2018. He also has a career high ATP doubles ranking of 984 achieved on 1 May 2017.

Szintai represents Hungary at the Davis Cup, where he has a W/L record of 0–1. He made his debut at the 2019 Davis Cup Qualifying Round in a dead rubber against Germany's Philipp Kohlschreiber in a losing effort.

Future and Challenger finals

Doubles 2 (1–1)

Davis Cup

Participations: (0–1)

   indicates the outcome of the Davis Cup match followed by the score, date, place of event, the zonal classification and its phase, and the court surface.

References

External links
 
 
 

1997 births
Living people
Hungarian male tennis players
21st-century Hungarian people